Bad Langensalza station is a railway station in Bad Langensalza, Thuringia, Germany.

References

External links

Railway stations in Thuringia
Buildings and structures in Unstrut-Hainich-Kreis
Railway stations in Germany opened in 1870